This list includes all passenger stations and halts in the state of Mecklenburg-Vorpommern in eastern Germany, that are used by scheduled services.

Key 
The list contains the following information:

 Name: Here the current name of the station or halt is given.
 City/District: This column shows the (abbreviated) district (Landkreis) or district-free city in which the station is located. The following towns and counties are found in the state:
 Ludwigslust-Parchim (Lu.-Pa.)
 Mecklenburgische Seenplatte (M. Seenpl.)
 Nordwestmecklenburg (Nwmeck.)
 Rostock (city, Rost.-c) 
 Rostock (district) (Rost.-d)
 Schwerin (city)
 Vorpommern-Greifswald (V.-Greif.)
 Vorpommern-Rügen (V.-Rügen)
 Transport Union (Verkehrsverbund): The only Mecklenburg transport union that is integrated into the public transport system is the Warnow Transport Union (Verkehrsverbund Warnow orVVW), which covers the Hanseatic city of Rostock and the neighbouring counties of Bad Doberan and Güstrow.
 Cat: The Cat column shows the present-day category of the station as at 1 January 2008. This only affects stations that are run by DB Station&Service and excludes stations run by private operators like the Usedomer Bäderbahn.
 The next five columns n show the types of train that serve the station. The DB AG abbreviations are used; for other operators the nearest equivalent is shown:
 ICE – Intercity-Express and similar
 IC – Intercity, Eurocity and similar, like e.g. Interconnex
 RE – Regionalexpress and similar
 RB – Regionalbahn and similar
 S – S-Bahn
 Route – This column gives the railway routes on which the station lies. Only those routes are named which are still open at the spot where the station is located. e. g. Waren (Müritz) and Neubrandenburg stations both lie on the Mecklenburg Southern Railway. Because this is only worked from Parchim to Waren, Neubrandenburg is not mentioned.
Remarks – in this column special remarks are given that are not covered in the other columns, in particular the name of the operator..

Station overview

See also 
 List of scheduled railway routes in Germany

Notes

External links 
 Mecklenburg-Vorpommern regional transport networks (pdf file, 134 kB)

 
!
Mecklenburg-Vorpommern
Rail